Janis Jean Ferraris (born June 2, 1947) is an American professional golfer who played on the LPGA Tour.

Ferraris won the 1963 U.S. Girls' Junior and the Women's Western Junior in 1963 and 1964. She was LPGA Rookie of the Year in 1966.

Ferraris won twice on the LPGA Tour, in 1971 and 1972.

Professional wins (3)

LPGA Tour wins (2)

LPGA Tour playoff record (0–1)

LPGA of Japan Tour wins (1)
1973 LPGA Japan Classic

References

External links

American female golfers
LPGA Tour golfers
Golfers from San Francisco
Golfers from Phoenix, Arizona
1947 births
Living people
21st-century American women